Exilisia bipuncta is a moth of the  subfamily Arctiinae. It was described by George Hampson in 1900. It is found on Madagascar.

References

 Natural History Museum Lepidoptera generic names catalog

Lithosiini
Moths described in 1900